Mehedi Haque Rony (born 31 December 1988) is a Bangladeshi Cinematographer. He also worked as Film Director and Editor. As a Best Editor, he won the National Film Awards in 2015.

Early life
Rony was born on 31 December 1988 in Kawkhali Upazila of Pirojpur District. In 2010, he finished the Bachelor of Business Administration (BBA) from a private university. While studying at the university, he offers short and long-term courses on film from several institutes of Bangladesh and India. He is currently the publicity secretary of the Bangladesh Cameraman Association and the full-time member of the Bangladesh Cinematographers Society.

Career
Rony joined the media station as a video editor in 2007. Then he worked as the editor of many organizations till 2010. Since 2010, he started Cinematography as well as editing. Since 2011, he is still working on Cinematography.Twelve fictions have been made under his direction so far. He achieved the Best Cinematography Nomination of the Charunirom Khahinichitro Award 2015 for the Telefilm Adarer Hrin. In the same year he achieved the National Film Award (Bangladesh) for Best Editor from Bapjaner Bioscope.

Cinematographer
Rony has been working as a freelance Cinematographer since 2010. Till now, he has done more than five hundred TV fiction as a Cinematographer. He has also worked as a documentary and several music videos and TV commercials.

Film
 Bapjaner Bioscope
 Darpon Bishorjon
 Omi o Ice Cream Wala
 Raton
 Bandhon
 Abotar
 Psycho
 Abar Bosonto
 Bosonto Bikel
 Kagojer Bou

Web series
 Horizone Polli
 Anandi
 Indubala
 Journey
 Dhoka
 Partner

Fiction

 Adharer Hrin (Broadcast On RTV)
 Jora Shalik (Broadcast On RTV)
 Sentimental (Broadcast On RTV)
 Ek  Mutho Valobasha (Broadcast On NTV)
 Porinoti (Broadcast On Banglavision TV)
 Manush / Omanush (Broadcast On NTV)
 Football (Broadcast On NTV)
 Mrs. Cook (Broadcast On Banglavision TV)
 Beginning from the End (broadcast on Channel 9 TV)
 Sonar manush (broadcast on Channel I TV)
 Vangon (broadcast on ATN Bangla TV)
 Mama detective (broadcast on Deepto TV)
 Anti-clock (broadcast on RTV)
 Pacemaker (Broadcast On Banglavision TV)
 Microphone (Broadcast On Banglavision TV)
 Ghuddi (Broadcast On Boishakhi TV)
 Ovinondon (Broadcast On Boishakhi TV)
 Basonto Megh (Broadcast On Maasranga TV)
 Sei Shob Din Gulo (Broadcast on Channel I TV)
 Sei Rokom Cha Khor (Broadcast On Banglavision TV)
 Issue (Broadcast on Channel I TV)
 Blank Point (Broadcast on Channel I TV)
 Test (Broadcast On Maasranga TV)
 Raini Raain (Broadcast On Maasranga TV)
 Aye Khuku Aye (Broadcast on Channel I TV)
 Shopno Jatra (Broadcast On Maasranga TV)
 Bashon (Broadcast in Bangladesh TV)
 Tare Bina (Broadcast on NTV)
 Golap Museum (Broadcast on Channel 9 TV)
 Man V/S Wild (Broadcast on Channel 9 TV)
 Kanamachi (Broadcast On Maasranga TV)
 Tosh (Broadcast on Channel 9 TV)
 Niyat Niyoti Nitantoi (Broadcast On Boishakhi TV)
 Fashoin (Broadcast on Channel I TV)
 Yrss Boss No Boss (Broadcast on N TV)
 Bablu Vaiya (Broadcast On Banglavision TV)

Non fiction
 USAID / PRICE - Mango farming awareness video
 Save the Children - Documentary on the ECB Project Summary
 Practical Action Bangladesh - Documentary on V2R Project Impact
 Care Bangladesh - Documentary Health initiative of RMG workers
 IFIC Bank - Documentary on the impact of agricultural credit services
 Gram Bikas Kendra - Documentary of Dalit community
 RDRS Bangladesh - Documentary of the Dialogue Project for Regional Empowerment
 BRAC - Female sexual harassment documentary
 Islamic Relief Bangladesh - Flood Forecasting and Alert Center Documentary
 Islamic Relief Bangladesh - IRB Aila Report Documentary in Satkhira

Awards
 National Film Awards (Bangladesh), (2015)
 Choruniram Television Kahinichitro Award, 2015

References

External links

1988 births
Living people
Best Editor National Film Award (Bangladesh) winners
Bangladeshi cinematographers
People from Pirojpur District